The 2000 LEN European Championships were held Monday 3 July to Sunday 9 July 2000 in Helsinki, Finland. Competition was swum in the 50 m, long course pool at the Mäkelänrinne Swimming Center. The 25th edition of the event was organised by the LEN less than three months prior to the Summer Olympics in Sydney, Australia.

The championships included the aquatic disciplines of Swimming (long course), Open Water Swimming, Diving, and Synchronised swimming.

Medal table

Swimming

Men's events

Women's events

Open water swimming

Men's events

Women's events

Diving

Men's events

Women's events

Synchronized swimming

References

External links
Results
 Swim Rankings results

European Aquatics Championships, 2000
S
LEN European Aquatics Championships
S
International sports competitions in Helsinki
Swimming competitions in Finland
July 2000 sports events in Europe
2000s in Helsinki